Alick Wyers (15 December 1907 – 28 November 1980) was an English first-class cricketer who played in one match for Worcestershire against Glamorgan in July 1927. He made just 3 in his only innings before being out lbw to Jack Mercer.

Wyers was born in Droitwich, Worcestershire. He died short of his 73rd birthday in Kidderminster; also in Worcestershire.

References

External links
 

1907 births
1980 deaths
People from Droitwich Spa
English cricketers
Worcestershire cricketers
Sportspeople from Worcestershire